The A3 motorway is a motorway in Serbia which spans approximately  and is part of the European route E70 through Serbia. It crosses the Syrmia region from east to west, starting at Belgrade and ending at border crossing with Croatia.

Route
The A3 motorway begins near Šid, at the Batrovci border crossing with Croatia, and runs westward across the Syrmia region, near Sremska Mitrovica and Ruma. At the Dobanovci interchange near the outskirts of Belgrade, A3 meets the Belgrade bypass.

The main toll stations of the A3 are located at and Batrovci near Šid and Šimanovci near Dobanovci. The Belgrade city motorway section between Šimanovci and Bubanj Potok interchanges is toll-free, serving as one of main city arteries. It includes the exit to Nikola Tesla Airport, located just south of the A3.

History
The A3 motorway is part of the old Belgrade-Zagreb motorway, known as Brotherhood and Unity Highway which was built after World War II, by young volunteers, and opened to traffic in 1950, first as a single carriageway. The second carriageway from Belgrade to Sremska Mitrovica was completed in 1977, while the section from Sremska Mitrovica to Šid was opened to traffic in 1987.

List of exits

See also
 Transport in Serbia
 National Road (M)1

References

External links

 Regulation of State Roads

Motorways in Serbia
Transport in Belgrade
Srem District